Wolf Trap National Park for the Performing Arts (originally known as the Wolf Trap Farm Park for the Performing Arts and simply known as Wolf Trap) is a performing arts center located on  of national park land in unincorporated Fairfax County, Virginia, near the town of Vienna. Through a partnership and collaboration of the National Park Service and the non-profit Wolf Trap Foundation for the Performing Arts, the park offers both natural and cultural resources.

The park began as a donation from Catherine Filene Shouse. Encroaching roads and suburbs led Shouse to preserve the former farm as a park. In 1966 Congress accepted Shouse's gift and authorized Wolf Trap Farm Park (its original name) as the first national park for the performing arts. On August 21, 2002, the park's name was changed to its present one to reflect its mission while keeping the historical significance of the area.

Wolf Trap Foundation for the Performing Arts
The Wolf Trap Foundation for the Performing Arts is a nonprofit organization founded by Catherine Filene Shouse concurrent with the donation of her Wolf Trap Farm to the National Park Service. The Park is operated as a public/private partnership between the Park Service and the Foundation. The former staffs and operates the park grounds, and the latter produces and presents the performance and education programs.

The Foundation presents performances in the Filene Center from May through September and at The Barns at Wolf Trap year-round. The latter venue being adjacent to but outside the park proper. In addition, the Foundation operates the Wolf Trap Opera Company, a resident company for young opera singers.

The Foundation's education programs, also located adjacent to but outside the park proper, include the national Wolf Trap Institute for Early Learning Through the Arts, a nationally recognized college internship program,  and the Children's Theatre-in-the-Woods. This last performance venue is located in the park proper.

Performing arts venues
Presently, Wolf Trap National Park for the Performing Arts organizes and runs several distinct venues and facilities as part of the whole park.  These include:

Filene Center

The Filene Center, named in honor of Mrs. Shouse's parents, Mr. and Mrs. Lincoln Filene (of the now-defunct department store chain), is the major indoor/outdoor performance venue with seating for 7,028 both under cover and on the lawn in a more casual style.  Performances are given nightly from May to early September and cover a wide range of musical styles from country music to opera.

The Filene Center was partially damaged by a fire on March 13, 1971, prior to its opening later that year. In all, damages cost around $650,000. Despite this setback, the Filene Center opened on schedule on July 1. On May 10, a benefit concert was held at Constitution Hall in Washington, D.C. to benefit the rebuilding effort, and featured Pierre Boulez conducting the New York Philharmonic Orchestra.

In the summer of 1971, sixty young musical performers were chosen for training in music, dance and acting, to culminate in a production in the newly conceived Filene Center.  The inaugural season opening was delayed one month due to a fire that destroyed most of the recently constructed center. When the Filene Center was finally completed, the theatre, constructed of Oregon redcedar, was a ten-story-high facility equipped with a computerized lighting system and sophisticated sound equipment.

The second Filene Center, constructed between 1982 and 1984, is made of douglas-fir with a yellow pine ceiling. It includes a smoke/fire detection and suppression system, as well as fire retardant wood, which all cost about a total of $1.7 million. The new amphitheater was also built with state-of-the-art sound and lighting equipment. The Filene Center contains a seating capacity of 7,028, including lawn seating, which can fit several hundred more patrons than the original Filene Center could. Also compared to the original, the second Filene Center contains improved access to handicapped people as well as more backstage space for performers and crews.

Today, the seating capacity of the Filene Center is about 7,000, including about 3,800 in-house seats and 3,200 lawn seats. The dimensions of the main stage are 116' wide × 64' deep × 102' high.

Children's Theatre in the Woods

With 70 performances from late June through early August, Children's Theatre in the Woods presents family-friendly shows at 10:30 a.m. on Tuesdays through Saturdays. Amidst 117 rolling wooded acres and nestled in a shady grove, the stage is set for lively adventures in music, dance, storytelling, puppetry, and theater. All performances are recommended for children between kindergarten and 6th grade.

In 2011, Theatre-in-the-Woods was featured in "Best Summer Ever if You've Got Little Ones" by The Washingtonian. The 2012 season of Theatre-in-the-Woods featured 34 performances from "local, national, international, and Grammy-nominated artists who represent folk, kindie-rock, storytelling, theatre, world-clad puppetry, and dance".

Meadow Pavilion

From the park's inception in 1971 until 2010, the Meadow Pavilion, a covered outdoor stage adjacent to Children's Theatre in the Woods, hosted events for the International Children's Festival at Wolf Trap (known as International Children's Day from 1971 to 1974). The Meadow Pavilion hasn't been used since 2010, although it still stands, and remains available for rental through the Wolf Trap Foundation.

On March 6, 1980, a welder's torch ignited a fire at the Meadow Pavilion, causing around $10,000 in damage.

The Barns at Wolf Trap
Built from two restored 18th-century barns this 382-seat theater holds performances between October and May.  Wolf Trap founder Catherine Filene Shouse worked with purchased the barns in upstate New York and had them relocated to the current site in 1981 using the 18th-century "block and tackle" method of construction.  The theater barn was originally built in 1780 and seats 285 on the threshing floor and another 98 in the hayloft.  The gathering barn is of the Scottish style and features a kitchen, bar and atrium.

History

Origins of Wolf Trap Farm
Early records of Fairfax County tell that wolves would run wild in the area, and bounties were granted for trapping them. In August 1739, J.M. Warner placed "Wolf Trap Creek," a branch of the Difficult Run tributary stream, in his survey, evidence that the name has been used for over 270 years. During the 18th and 19th centuries, the land at Wolf Trap had been frequently exchanged between wealthy families in the Fairfax area, including Bryan Fairfax, the 8th Lord Fairfax of Cameron and longtime friend of George Washington. By 1956, her holdings encompassed .

Mrs. Shouse bought Wolf Trap to offer her children a weekend retreat from their home in Georgetown, Washington, D.C. There they grew corn, wheat, alfalfa, and oats to feed their chickens, ducks, turkeys, and milk cows. They bred horses, built a stable and a hay barn, and opened a dog-breeding kennel, producing champion boxers, miniature pinschers, and Weimaraners. During this time, Shouse and her husband, Jouett Shouse, would frequently host large social gatherings for friends, family, and prominent public figures, including World War II Generals Omar Bradley and George C. Marshall and several members of the Dumbarton Oaks Conference in 1944.

Donation of Wolf Trap to Congress, 1966–1970
In a letter to Congress that year, Udall argued that Wolf Trap would "augment the park and recreation opportunities in the National Capital region and involve the expenditure of only a minimum of Federal funds." On May 28, 1966, Virginia Senator A. Willis Robertson introduced a bill to Congress to create and fund Wolf Trap, which passed with relative ease. Mrs. Shouse also offered over $2 million to construct the Filene Center for performances.

Around the same time, the Kennedy Center and Merriweather Post Pavilion, two other nearby concert venues, were also being constructed, so there were some questions in Congress about overloading the area with too many arts and music venues.  Rep. George H. Fallon of Maryland, for example, opposed the Wolf Trap bill on the basis that it would "only have the effect of dividing a small market" and would be in "direct conflict" with the Kennedy Center and Merriweather Post Pavilion.  Nevertheless, Wolf Trap became and remains the first and only U.S. National Park dedicated to the performance arts.  With this collaboration, Mrs. Shouse became the first person to establish a partnership with the U.S. in bringing performing arts to the nation.

Ground was broken for the construction of the Filene Center in 1968, and the next year, Wolf Trap held its first concert.  A ceremony was held for the topping out of the Filene Center in May 1970, attended by then-First Lady Pat Nixon.

First performance seasons

The inaugural performance at Wolf Trap occurred on June 1–2, 1971, and featured  Van Cliburn, Julius Rudel conducting the New York City Opera with Norman Treigle, as well as performances by National Symphony Orchestra, Choral Arts Society of Washington, United States Marine Band and  the Madison Madrigal Singers.

For the first several performances at the Filene Center, Robert Lewis, founder of the Actors Studio and acclaimed Broadway director, was chosen to conduct the training program and direct the production called Musical Theatre Cavalcade.  With a multimedia set by Leo Kerz, choreography by Gemeze de Lappe, and musical direction by Johnny Green, the Cavalcade was a history of musical theater from The Beggar's Opera to Hair.  Pat Nixon, wife of President Richard Nixon, attended the opening night performance and afterwards invited the entire cast to the White House for a reception.

The first dozen seasons saw many performances and events of historical significance.  In 1971, produced by the National Council for the Traditional Arts, the National Folk Festival was the first event at Wolf Trap to use the park grounds (versus Filene Center itself) for performances, and it set a precedent for other events at Wolf Trap to do the same.  That same year, Richard Nixon became the first U.S. President to attend a Wolf Trap performance, viewing the Wolf Trap Company's performance of the "Musical Theater Cavacade" on August 12.  In 1976, the Scottish Military Tattoo, a Bicentennial gift from Britain, performed at the Filene Center for capacity audiences including Britain's Prince Philip. Two years later, in 1978, the People's Republic of China's performing arts ensemble entertained Wolf Trap's audience with acrobatic troupes and dancers in one of the first cultural exchanges between China and the United States. From 1971 until the early 1980s, the National Folk Festival was held annually at Wolf Trap. In the 1970s, WETA-TV produced the television series In Performance at Wolf Trap.

Other highlights included Sarah Caldwell's production of Sergei Prokofiev's opera War and Peace, the Royal Ballet, Preservation Hall Jazz Band, the annual US National Symphony Orchestra's 1812 Overture concerts with live cannons and Beverly Sills' 1981 farewell appearance.

Composers' Cottage, 1971–1979
In May 1971, plans were developed to construct a series of composers' cottages across the park, where performing artists could stay for a temporary period and peacefully work on their respective works.  Although five cottages were planned, only one was ever built.  The two-bedroom house was donated by Edward R. Carr Jr., a metropolitan area realtor, and built by Fairfax County high school students; it was finished and dedicated in December 1973.  During the next five years, the composers' cottage hosted several noteworthy composers, including Lester Trimble, Irwin Bazelon and Elie Siegmeister.

In 1979, however, a fire destroyed the composers' cottage, and it was never rebuilt.

1982 Filene Center fire

As Wolf Trap was preparing for its 12th season, tragedy struck once again. On April 4, 1982, a fire of undetermined origin, intensified by high gusting winds, destroyed the Filene Center.

WETA-TV also sponsored a star-studded, three-hour national telethon that raised more than $390,000 for the reconstruction of the Filene Center.

Almost immediately, the Wolf Trap Foundation, the park's non-profit partner, announced that a 1982 season would still take place in the Meadow Center, a huge tent erected in the nearby meadow.  The prefabricated structure, purchased with private and government funds, was disassembled from its previous site in the United Arab Emirates and transported to Wolf Trap by the government of Saudi Arabia. Volunteers provided much of the labor to erect the structure.

In the aftermath of the fire, the United States Postal Service issued a commemorative stamp honoring Wolf Trap on September 1, 1982.  The stamp was the first in a series honoring Washington D.C.'s range of cultural attractions, including the National Gallery of Art and the National Air and Space Museum.

The first performance at the newly designed and constructed Filene Center, titled the "Filene Center Dedication," occurred on June 20, 1984.
The design work was accomplished by Dewberry and Davis, Joseph Boggs Studio, Architects.  The new building featured state of the art fireproof design and acoustics. Attendees included opera star and frequent Wolf Trap performer Beverly Sills and then-Virginia Governor Charles Robb, as well as Mrs. Shouse herself.

Free tickets to Secretary of the Interior

In a September 4, 2018, report, the Office of Inspector General for the Department of the Interior, of which the National Park Service is a part, revealed that the Secretary of the Interior — Ryan Zinke at the time — had for decades been given access to eight free tickets for each event at Wolf Trap by the Wolf Trap Foundation, a benefit that was worth about $43,000 per year at the time of the report. The report raised ethics concerns about the tickets, since United States law generally prohibits government employees from receiving gifts. The inspector general's office recommended a review of the setup by ethics officials within the agency, and the department agreed to conduct the review.

Despite the concerns, the National Park Service signed a new agreement with the Wolf Trap Foundation on May 3, 2019, that continued to provide the secretary's eight tickets for each performance for 20 additional years. A Park Service spokesperson said the department conducted an ethical and legal review and "it was confirmed that the tickets are government property and may be used by the Department for authorized purposes."

Wolf Trap in the Twenty-First Century

Wolf Trap hosts an average of 95 to 97 shows during its performance season, which runs from late May to early September. However, due to fewer artists touring in 2009, Wolf Trap only held 86 performances and reported a revenue decrease of about ten percent.

On September 24, 2011, in conjunction with National Public Lands Day and First Lady Michelle Obama's Let's Move! campaign, Wolf Trap held its first annual "Let's Move with Music at Wolf Trap!" event.

After touring for 16 years in North America, Riverdance had its final US performance on July 17, 2012, at Wolf Trap.

See also
 List of concert halls
 List of contemporary amphitheatres
 List of national parks of the United States
 International Children's Festival at Wolf Trap

Footnotes

External links

National Park Service: Wolf Trap National Park for the Performing Arts
Wolf Trap Foundation for the Performing Arts
 
 

Parks in Fairfax County, Virginia
Music venues in Virginia
Performing arts centers in Virginia
National parks in Virginia
Theatre in Virginia
Members of the Cultural Alliance of Greater Washington
Protected areas established in 1966
Tourist attractions in Fairfax County, Virginia
Vienna, Virginia
1966 establishments in Virginia